Dmitriy Sabin (sometimes listed as Dmytro Sablin, born February 7, 1979) is a Ukrainian sprint canoer who competed in the early 2000s. He won two medals at the ICF Canoe Sprint World Championships with a gold (C-1 200 m: 2001) and a bronze (C-2 200 m: 2003). Sabin also won a silver in the C-1 200 m event at the 2002 ICF Canoe Sprint World Championships in Seville, but was disqualified for doping though he was allowed to compete at the following year's world championships.

Sabin also finished eighth in the C-2 500 m event at the 2000 Summer Olympics in Sydney.

References

1979 births
Canoeists at the 2000 Summer Olympics
Doping cases in canoeing
Living people
Olympic canoeists of Ukraine
Ukrainian male canoeists
Ukrainian sportspeople in doping cases
ICF Canoe Sprint World Championships medalists in Canadian
21st-century Ukrainian people